Radio Disney Jams was a series of CD compilations of music that was featured on Radio Disney, a children's radio network.

The first album was released in 1999, titled Radio Disney Kid Jams, containing the top songs from Radio Disney's playlist. Additional volumes of the Jams series were periodically released over time, dropping "Kid" from the titles. Special albums spun off from the series included two Holiday Jams albums, an Ultimate Jams with select songs from Jams 1-6, Jingle Jams (Series 2004 & 2005), Pop Dreamers, Move It, Party Jams from their tenth birthday concert, a 15th Birthday Edition, and a 2015 awards show edition.

The last volume of the series, Volume 12, was released on March 30, 2010, and the last two specials (15th Birthday Edition and Radio Disney Music Awards) were released on August 16, 2011, and April 21, 2015, respectively.

Radio Disney Jams

Radio Disney: Kid Jams  

Radio Disney: Kid Jams is the first album of Radio Disney Jams. It is a compilation of artists whose songs were played on Radio Disney. It was released on both CD & cassette tape.

Radio Disney Jams, Vol. 2  

Radio Disney Jams, Vol. 2 is the second album of Radio Disney Jams, released by Walt Disney Records in 2000 on CD, and the last to be offered on cassette tape. The album is a compilation of several artists whose songs were regularly featured on Radio Disney. It peaked at No. 92 on the Billboard 200 and No. 1 on the Billboard Kid Albums chart. It was certified gold by the RIAA on January 22, 2002.

Radio Disney Jams, Vol. 3  

Radio Disney Jams, Vol. 3 is the third album in the Radio Disney Jams series, released on February 13, 2001. It peaked at No. 109 on the Billboard 200 on March 3, 2001, and No. 1 on the Billboard Kid Albums chart.

Radio Disney Jams, Vol. 4  

Radio Disney Jams, Vol. 4 is the fourth volume in the Radio Disney Jams series. The album was released on September 25, 2001, and contains top songs from Radio Disney's playlist. The CD peaked at No. 169 on the Billboard 200 and No. 1 on the Billboard Kid Albums chart.

Radio Disney Jams, Vol. 5  

Radio Disney Jams, Vol. 5 is the fifth installment in the Radio Disney Jams series containing popular songs from Radio Disney's playlist. It peaked at No. 122 on the Billboard 200 and No. 2 on the Billboard Kid Albums chart.

Radio Disney Jams, Vol. 6  

Radio Disney Jams, Vol. 6 is the sixth album in the Radio Disney Jams Series. It's a compilation of artists whose songs are played on Radio Disney. It peaked at No. 105 on the Billboard 200 and No. 3 on the Billboard Kid Albums chart.

Radio Disney Jams, Vol. 7  

Radio Disney Jams, Vol. 7 is the seventh installment in Radio Disney's Jams music compilation series. Featuring artists regularly featured on Radio Disney, the album peaked at No. 109 on the Billboard 200 and No. 3 on the Billboard Kid Albums chart.

Bonus DVD

 "Tangled Up in Me" - Skye Sweetnam
 "Because You Live" - Jesse McCartney
 "Backflip" - Raven-Symoné
 "The Naked Mole Rap" - Will Friedle and Nancy Cartwright
 "Geek Love (Oh My Gosh Version)" - fan_3

Radio Disney Jams, Vol. 8  

Radio Disney Jams, Vol. 8 is the eighth album from the Radio Disney Jams series. Released by Walt Disney Records, the album is a compilation of several artists that have songs that were played on Radio Disney. It peaked at No. 70 on the Billboard 200 and No. 2 on the Billboard Kid Albums chart.

Bonus DVD

 "Fly" - Hilary Duff
 "What's Your Name?" - Jesse McCartney
 "Do You Believe In Magic" - Aly & AJ
 "Shake a Tail Feather" - The Cheetah Girls
 "Just the Way I Am" - Skye Sweetnam

Radio Disney Jams, Vol. 9  

Radio Disney Jams, Vol. 9 is the ninth album from the Radio Disney Jams series. It's a compilation of artists whose songs are played on Radio Disney. It peaked at No. 56 on the Billboard 200.

Bonus DVD

 "Best of Both Worlds" - Miley Cyrus
 "Chemicals React" - Aly & AJ
 "Vertical" - T-Squad
 "Route 66" - The Cheetah Girls
 "Find Yourself in You" - Everlife

Radio Disney Jams, Vol. 10  

Radio Disney Jams, Vol. 10 is the tenth album in the Radio Disney Jams series. Released on January 22, 2008, it's a compilation of popular songs played on Radio Disney. It peaked at No. 18 on the Billboard 200 and No. 16 on the Billboard Kid Albums chart.

Bonus DVD

 "Nobody's Perfect" - Hannah Montana
 "That's Just the Way We Roll" - Jonas Brothers
 "Hey There Delilah" - Plain White T's
 "Fabulous" - Ashley Tisdale and Lucas Grabeel
 "Say OK" - Vanessa Hudgens

Radio Disney Jams, Vol. 11  

Radio Disney Jams, Vol. 11 is the eleventh album in the Radio Disney Jams series. It's a compilation of popular songs played on Radio Disney. It peaked at No. 41 on the Billboard 200 and No. 1 on the Billboard Kid Albums chart.

Bonus DVD

 "Right Here, Right Now" - Zac Efron and Vanessa Hudgens
 "Future Love" - Varsity Fanclub
 "Burnin' Up" - Jonas Brothers
 "Fly on the Wall" - Miley Cyrus
 "One Love" - Jordan Pruitt
 Making of the Album - Mitchel Musso
 Meet the Band - KSM

Radio Disney Jams, Vol. 12  

Radio Disney Jams, Vol. 12 is the twelfth entry in the Radio Disney Jams series of compilation albums featuring popular songs played on Radio Disney. Released on March 30, 2010, CDs autographed by Justin Bieber were given out as codeword of the day prizes during the end of March. Radio Disney also had a grand prize in which the winner would go to a concert featuring all the singers. The winner was announced on Friday, April 2, 2010.

Holiday and Jingle Jams

Radio Disney Holiday Jams  

Radio Disney Holiday Jams is a Christmas album released by Walt Disney Records on October 31, 2000. On December 8, 2002, the album peaked on the Billboard charts, reaching No. 24 on the Holiday Albums chart, No. 19 on the Catalog Albums charts, and No. 4 on the Kids Albums chart.

 "Jingle Bell Rock" - Bobby Helms
 "Merry Christmas, Happy Holidays" - NSYNC
 "Little Saint Nick" - The Beach Boys
 "The Chipmunk Song (Christmas Don't Be Late)" - The Chipmunks
 "Last Christmas" - Billie
 "Rockin' Around the Christmas Tree" - Brenda Lee
 "Frosty the Snowman" - Myra
 "Deck the Halls" - SHeDAISY
 "Jingle Bells" - The Singing Dogs
 "Santa Claus Is Comin' to Town" - The Jackson 5
 "Sleigh Ride" - Spice Girls
 "Grandma Got Run Over by a Reindeer" - Elmo & Patsy
 "A Holly Jolly Christmas" - Burl Ives
 "Macarena Christmas" - Los Del Rio
 "As Long as There's Christmas" - Peabo Bryson and Roberta Flack

Radio Disney Holiday Jams 2  

Radio Disney Holiday Jams 2 is a Christmas album released by Walt Disney Records on October 15, 2002. The album contains a collection of popular Christmas songs.

 "I Wish It Could Be Christmas Everyday" - A*Teens
 "As Long as There's Christmas" - Play
 "Wonderful Christmas Time" - Jump5
 "Feliz Navidad" - Jose Feliciano
 "It's Beginning to Look a Lot Like Christmas" - Johnny Mathis
 "Santa Claus Lane" - Hilary Duff
 "Here Comes Santa Claus" - Gene Autry
 "Christmas Time" - Backstreet Boys
 "Rudolph the Red-Nosed Reindeer" - Burl Ives
 "Go Girlfriend (Have a Merry Christmas)" - No Secrets
 "Santa Claus Is Comin' to Town" - B2K
 "I Saw Mommy Kissing Santa Claus" - The Jackson 5
 "The Chimney Song" - Bob Rivers
 "My Christmas List" (Radio Disney Edit) - Simple Plan

Radio Disney Jingle Jams  

Radio Disney Jingle Jams is a special collection of 17 Christmas carols tracks, both original and revived, featuring  Hilary Duff, Raven-Symoné, Jesse McCartney, Aly & AJ, and Ashlee Simpson. It was released by Walt Disney Records during the winter seasons of 2004 and 2005.

2004 release 

 "Winter Wonderland" - Jesse McCartney - 2:50
 "Santa Claus Lane" (North Pole Mix) - Hilary Duff 3:02
 "Dear Santa" - The Beu Sisters - 2:57
 "I Love Christmas" - fan_3 - 3:27
 "Santa Claus Is Coming to Town" - Stevie Brock - 3:27
 "Sleigh Ride" - Jump5 - 3:13
 "Toy Town" - Christy Carlson Romano - 3:31
 "One Way or Another" - Jesse McCartney - 3:28
 "Jingle Bell Rock" - Aly & AJ - 2:41
 "Run Rudolph Run" - Aaron Carter - 2:41
 "My Christmas Wish" - Raven-Symoné - 3:29
 "Christmas Past, Present and Future" - Ashlee Simpson - 2:42
 "Have Yourself a Merry Little Christmas" - Greg Raposo - 3:23
 "Why Doesn't Santa Like Me?" - Skye Sweetnam - 2:40
 "White Christmas" - Stacie Orrico - 3:39
 "Wild Christmas" - Huckapoo - 3:29
 "Circle of Life" (Christmas version) - Circle of Stars - 4:15

2005 release 

 "Someday at Christmas" - B5 - 2:51
 "Everyday is Christmas" - Everlife - 3:29
 "Winter Wonderland" - Jesse McCartney - 2:50
 "A Dream is a Wish Your Heart Makes" (Christmas version) - Circle of Stars - 3:47
 "Santa Claus Lane" (North Pole mix) - Hilary Duff - 3:02
 "Jingle Bell Rock" - Aly & AJ - 2:41
 "I Love Christmas" - fan 3 - 3:27
 "Feels Like Christmas" - Caleigh Peters - 2:58
 "One Way or Another" - Jesse McCartney - 3:28
 "Home for Christmas" - The Beu Sisters - 3:26
 "Sleigh Ride" - Jump5 - 3:13
 "Toy Town" - Christy Carlson Romano - 3:31
 "Run, Rudolph, Run" - Aaron Carter - 2:41
 "My Christmas Wish" - Raven-Symoné - 3:29
 "Christmas Past, Present and Future" - Ashlee Simpson - 2:42
 "Why Doesn't Santa Like Me?" - Skye Sweetnam - 2:40
 "Circle of Life" (Christmas version) - Circle of Stars - 4:15

Special and independent CDs

Radio Disney's Pop Dreamers  

Radio Disney's Pop Dreamers is an album released by Walt Disney Records on August 20, 2002 for the doll line of the same name. The songs are performed by Julie Griffen, Patty Mattson, and Nadia Fay as Ari, Ella, and Gabrielle.  The majority of the songs are covers of other songs, four of which are Disney Princess songs, along with five original songs, including a theme for each character.

It went on to reach No. 13 on Billboard's Top Kid Audio chart. The album is available for purchase from the U.S. iTunes Music Store.

 "Be a Star"
 "Beauty and the Beast" (originally performed by Angela Lansbury from the movie of the same name)
 "We Got the Beat" (originally performed by The Go-Go's)
 "If You Can Dream" (originally performed by Ella)
 "Better Together" (originally performed by Ari)
 "A Dream is a Wish Your Heart Makes" (originally performed by Ilene Woods from Cinderella)
 "Walking on Sunshine" (originally performed by Katrina and the Waves)
 "Part of Your World" (originally performed by Jodi Benson from The Little Mermaid)
 "Between the Lines" (originally performed by Gabrielle)
 "Do What We Wanna Do"
 "Some Day My Prince Will Come" (originally performed by Adriana Caselotti from Snow White and the Seven Dwarfs)
 "Give a Little Love" (originally performed by Ziggy Marley)

Radio Disney Ultimate Jams  

Radio Disney Ultimate Jams is a compilation of songs previously featured on the first six volumes of the Radio Disney Jams series. Released as a two-disc package by Walt Disney Records, it features a DVD containing music videos from six songs on the album. It peaked at No. 75 on the Billboard 200 and No. 182 on the Billboard Kid Albums chart.

 "I Can't Wait" – Hilary Duff
 "Dig It" – D-Tent Boys
 "Spinnin' Around" – Jump5
 "Juliet" – LMNT
 "Blue (Da Ba Dee)" – Eiffel 65
 "Get Ready for This" – 2 Unlimited
 "Can't Help Falling in Love" – A*Teens
 "Disney Mambo #5 (A Little Bit Of...)" – Lou Bega
 "Y.M.C.A." – Village People
 "I Got You (I Feel Good)" – James Brown
 "You Make Me Feel Like a Star" – The Beu Sisters
 "Pump Up the Jam" – Technotronic
 "All for Love" – Stevie Brock
 "The Hamster Dance" – Hampton the Hampster
 "Move It Like This" – Baha Men

Bonus DVD

 "Disney Mambo #5 (A Little Bit Of...)" – Lou Bega
 "I Can't Wait" – Hilary Duff
 "Spinnin' Around" – Jump5
 "Hampster Dance" – Hampton the Hampster
 "All for Love" – Stevie Brock
 "Disneymania 2" (featuring Hilary Duff, Haylie Duff, Raven-Symoné, and Stevie Brock)

Radio Disney: Move It!   

Radio Disney: Move It! is a collection of songs that help kids move and exercise in relation to staying healthy.

Radio Disney: Party Jams 

Radio Disney: Party Jams is a collection of songs that celebrated Radio Disney's 10th birthday on November 18, 2006. The bonus DVD contains some performances from their Totally 10th Birthday Party concert that was held on July 22, 2006 at the Arrowhead Pond in Anaheim, California. A separate DVD containing the full concert performance was also released titled Radio Disney: Party Jams, The Concert.

{{tracklist
| collapsed       =
| headline        =
| extra_column    = Recording artist(s)
| all_writing     =
| all_lyrics      =
| all_music       =
| title1          = BFS Birthday Song
| extra1          = Bowling for Soup
| length1         = 2:05
| title2          = Pumpin' Up the Party| extra2          = Miley Cyrus
| length2         = 3:09
| title3          = We're All in This Together
| extra3          = High School Musical Cast
| length3         = 3:51
| title4          = Wake Up
| extra4          = Hilary Duff
| length4         = 3:38
| title5          = Rush
| extra5          = Aly & AJ
| length5         = 3:10
| title6          = What's Your Name?
| extra6          = Jesse McCartney
| length6         = 3:40
| title7          = Shake a Tail Feather
| extra7          = The Cheetah Girls
| length7         = 3:04
| title8          = Real Wild Child
| extra8          = Everlife
| length8         = 3:15
| title9          = Let's Groove
| extra9          = B5
| length9         = 3:35
| title10         = The Birthday Song
| extra10         = T-Squad
| length10        = 2:00
}}

Bonus DVD

 "Who Said" (from the first season of Hannah Montana) by Miley Cyrus
 "Best of Both Worlds" by Miley Cyrus
 "Find Yourself in You" by Everlife
 "Real Wild Child" by Everlife
 "Rush" by Aly & AJ
 "No One" by Aly & AJ
 "The Party's Just Begun" by The Cheetah Girls
 "Cheetah Sisters" by The Cheetah Girls
 "Right Where You Want Me" by Jesse McCartney
 "Beautiful Soul" by Jesse McCartney

 Radio Disney Jams: 15th Birthday Edition  

The Radio Disney Jams: 15th Birthday Edition was released on August 16, 2011. It is a compilation of songs that were frequently played on Radio Disney from 1999 through the time of its release in 2011. Before the album was released, Radio Disney hosted a concert featuring Cody Simpson, Nigel Pilkington, Dan Russell and Emma Tate.

 Radio Disney Music Awards Radio Disney Music Awards'' was released on April 21, 2015. It is a compilation of songs by nominees of the Radio Disney Music Awards in 2015.

References 

Compilation album series
Disney albums
Radio Disney